NiuTrans is a machine translation system. It has a platform, an API, and two open-source translation systems.
It is developed by the Natural Language Processing Group at Northeastern University (China).

Translation systems 
NiuTrans.SMT is an open-source statistical machine translation system jointly developed by the Natural Language Processing Laboratory of Northeastern University and Shenyang Yayi Network Technology Co., Ltd.

NiuTrans.NMT is a lightweight and efficient Transformer-based neural machine translation system.  It is implemented with pure C++ and it is heavily optimized for fast decoding. The system can run with various systems and devices

See also
 Apertium
 Moses (machine translation)

External links
 NiuTrans platform
 NLP Lab at Northeastern University
 NiuTrans.NMT on Github
 NiuTrans.SMT on Github

References
 Tong Xiao, Jingbo Zhu, Hao Zhang and Qiang Li. 2012. NiuTrans: An Open Source Toolkit for Phrase-based and Syntax-based Machine Translation. In Proc. of ACL, demonstration session.

Machine translation software
Natural language processing toolkits
Free software programmed in C++